Hinkes is a surname. Notable people with the surname include:

 Sidney Hinkes (1925–2005), British priest and pacifist
 Alan Hinkes (born 1954), British mountaineer

See also
 Hinks